The Ailerons were an English indie rock band featuring Charity Hair, Daniel Beattie, Dave Rowntree, Grog Prebble and Mike Smith. 

In 2006, they were brought into public view due to their song, "Dig a Hole" being featured as iTunes' free single of the week. The song was from the band's only EP, Left Right. Charity Hair has also worked with Shelly Poole on some songs.

Discography

EPs

Left Right (16 October 2006) 
Track listing:
 "Dig a Hole" – 2:39
 "Bonafone" – 3:59
 "Waking Fever" – 5:04
 "Roll Over" – 2:45

References

External links 

English art rock groups
Musical groups established in 2006
English indie rock groups
Musical groups from London